Medical Examination (Seafarers) Convention, 1946 is  an International Labour Organization Convention (Number 73).

It was established in 1946, with the preamble stating:
Having decided upon the adoption of certain proposals with regard to the medical examination of seafarers,...

Revision
The principles contained in the convention have been revised and were included in the 2006 Maritime Labour Convention.

Ratifications
As of 2023, the convention has been ratified by 46 states. Of the ratifying states, 35 have subsequently denounced the treaty.

External links 
Text.
Ratifications.

International Labour Organization conventions
Treaties concluded in 1946
Treaties entered into force in 1955
Treaties of Algeria
Treaties of the People's Republic of Angola
Treaties of Argentina
Treaties of Azerbaijan
Treaties of Belgium
Treaties of Bosnia and Herzegovina
Treaties of Djibouti
Treaties of Egypt
Treaties of Guinea-Bissau
Treaties of West Germany
Treaties of Ireland
Treaties of Italy
Treaties of Japan
Treaties of South Korea
Treaties of Kyrgyzstan
Treaties of Lebanon
Treaties of Lithuania
Treaties of Montenegro
Treaties of Panama
Treaties of Peru
Treaties of the Estado Novo (Portugal)
Treaties of Yugoslavia
Treaties of Seychelles
Treaties of Slovenia
Treaties of Tajikistan
Treaties of North Macedonia
Treaties of Tunisia
Treaties of Turkey
Treaties of Uruguay
Treaties of the Ukrainian Soviet Socialist Republic
Treaties of Serbia and Montenegro
Admiralty law treaties
Treaties extended to French Guiana
Treaties extended to the French Southern and Antarctic Lands
Treaties extended to Guadeloupe
Treaties extended to Martinique
Treaties extended to Réunion
Occupational safety and health treaties
1946 in labor relations